Bolshoye Murashkino is the name of several inhabited localities in Russia.

Urban localities
Bolshoye Murashkino, Nizhny Novgorod Oblast, a work settlement in Bolshemurashkinsky District of Nizhny Novgorod Oblast

Rural localities
Bolshoye Murashkino, Arkhangelsk Oblast, a village in Cherevkovsky Selsoviet of Krasnoborsky District of Arkhangelsk Oblast